Chunati Government Women's College is an educational institute from Chittagong in Bangladesh.

Location 
The college is located at Chunati Union of Lohagara Upazila, Chittagong.

History 
The college was established in 1989 but it becomes under government on 20 April 2017.

Teaching staff 
The head teacher of the institute is Muhammad Abu Naeem Azad.

Education 
It is an undergraduate level educational institution for only girls. It operates under National University. At present, besides the graduation (pass) course, honors course is also in this college.

References 

Lohagara Upazila, Chittagong
Colleges in Chittagong
1989 establishments in Bangladesh